SMOLART is a Russian Agency based in Moscow (Russia), specializing in the international artist management of individual artists, ensembles and projects primarily in the area of classical music and dance (ballet). The Agency was founded in 2009  in Moscow, Russia. SMOLART Director is Mr. Sergei Molchanov.,

SMOLART is the only Russian Agency accepted as a full member to the International Artist Managers' Association (IAMA) (as of 15 November 2012).

In the focus
 opera and ballet projects with leading soloists of Bolshoi, Mariinsky (Kirov) and other famous theatres 
 concerts of instrumentalists (pianists, violinists, cellists) 
 folk and choral music 
 tours of ballet companies

SMOLART offers to its foreign partners complete classical ballets, ballet gala performances, folk dance and songs performances, opera singers, instrumental and classical chamber music concerts.

References

Arts organizations established in 2009
Organizations based in Moscow
Entertainment organizations